Irdyn is an urban-type settlement located in Cherkasy Raion (district) of Cherkasy Oblast (region) in central Ukraine. Population: 

The settlement belongs to Bilozirya rural hromada, with the administration in the selo of Bilozirya.

History 
Urban-type settlement was founded in 1930.

In January 1989 the population was 1357 people.

In January 2013 the population was 865 people.

References

Urban-type settlements in Cherkasy Raion
Populated places established in 1941